MSWLogo is a programming language which is interpreted, based on the computer language Logo, with a graphical user interface (GUI) front end. It was developed by George Mills at the Massachusetts Institute of Technology (MIT). Its core is the same as UCBLogo by Brian Harvey. It is free and open-source  software, with source code available, in Borland C++.

MSWLogo supports multiple turtle graphics, 3D computer graphics, and allows input from ports COM and LPT. It also supports a windows interface, so input/output (I/O) is available through this GUI, and keyboard and mouse events can trigger interrupts. Simple GIF animations may also be produced on MSWLogo version 6.5 with the command gifsave. The program is also used as educational software. Jim Muller wrote The Great Logo Adventure, a complete Logo manual using MSWLogo as the demonstration language.

MSWLogo has evolved into FMSLogo: An Educational Programming Environment, a free, open source implementation of the language Logo for Microsoft Windows. It is released under the GNU General Public License (GPL) and is mainly developed and maintained by David Costanzo.

Features

MSWLogo, as of version 6.5b, supports many functions, including:
 TCP/IP Winsock networking
 Win16, Win32, Win32s
 Text in all available fonts and sizes.
 1024 independent turtles.
 Bitmapped turtles
 Bitmap cut, paste, stretch
 Clipboard text and bitmaps
 MIDI devices
 Direct I/O to control external hardware
 Serial and parallel port communications
 Zooming
 Tail recursion: optimizes most recursive functions
 User error handling
 Standard Logo parsing
 Save and restore images in .BMP format files
 Color bits per pixel: 1, 4, 8, 16, 24
 Standard Windows hypertext help
 Standard Windows printing
 Separate library and work area
 Construction of Windows dialog boxes
 Event driven programming: mouse, keyboard, timer
 Multimedia devices: WAV sound files, CD-ROM control, etc.
 Event timers allowing multiprocessing
 3D perspective drawing: wire-frame and solid
 Animated GIF generation

References

External links
 

Interpreters (computing)
Educational programming languages
Logo programming language family